Centennial High School (CeHS) is a public secondary school  in Peoria, Arizona, United States, part of the Peoria Unified School District. The school opened its doors in August 1990.

Academics
The class of 2010 had a 96% graduation rate with 32% going on to attend a 4-year college and 48% going on to attend a 2-year college.

Other academic achievements:
 2007–2008: Centennial had 1 National Merit Finalist and 1 National Hispanic Scholar.
 2008–2009: Centennial had 2 students recognized by the National Merit program as commended students.
 2009–2010: Centennial had 1 student recognized by the National Merit program as a commended student.
 2010–2011: Centennial has 2 students named National Merit Semi-finalists, 1 student named National Merit Finalist and 1 student named a National Hispanic Scholar.

Athletics
Centennial's athletics teams include:

Fall
 Football [Male] (Varsity/Junior Varsity/Freshman)
 Volleyball [Female] (Varsity/Junior Varsity/Freshman)
 Cross Country [Male and Female] (All Classes)
 Golf [Male and Female] (All Classes)
 Swim [Male and Female] (All Classes)
 Badminton [Female] (Varsity, Junior Varsity)
 Diving [Male and Female] (All Classes]

Winter
 Basketball [Male and Female] (Varsity/Junior Varsity/Freshman)
 Soccer [Male and Female] (Varsity/Junior Varsity/Freshman)
 Wrestling [Male and Female] (All Classes)

Spring
 Boys' Baseball [Male] (Varsity/Junior Varsity/Freshman)
 Girls' Softball [Female] (Varsity/Junior Varsity/Freshman)
 Tennis [Male and Female] (All Classes)
 Track [Male and Female] (All Classes)
 Volleyball [Male] (Varsity/Junior Varsity/Freshman)

State titles
Football: The Centennial football team has won the state title in: 2018, 2017 (5A), 2015 (Div I), 2014 (Div II), 2008, 2007, and 2006 (5A Div II).
Softball: The Centennial girls' softball team won the state title in 2010 (5A Div II).
 The Centennial boys' track and field team won state titles in 2004 and 2005 (4A).
Volleyball: The Centennial girls' volleyball team won state titles in: 2016 (5A), 2008 (5A Div II), and 1998 (4A Div II).

Visual and performing arts
The Performing Arts division at CeHS is designed to allow students to explore a variety of visual performing arts. Visual art classes include art, ceramics, media, and photo. Centennial also offers classes in dance, chorus, and band.

Band program
The band program includes the Pride of the Pack Marching Band & Color Guard, Jazz Bands, Orchestra, and Guitar/Piano. Every other year beginning in 1992, Centennial's marching band has been chosen to perform at the Disneyland Resort in Southern California as an Excelling, Division II high school marching band. The bands—including marching, jazz, and strings—have performed in competitions at locations including Northern Arizona University, Arizona State University, the University of Arizona, the Disneyland Resort, SeaWorld San Diego, as well as high schools throughout Arizona and California.

Clubs
Clubs include: SEA Club (Science & Environmental Awareness), Drama Club, Plan B Improv Club, International Thespian Society, CCC (Christian Club on Campus), DECA (Distributive Education Clubs of America), FBLA (Future Business Leaders of America), FEA (Future Educators of America), NHS (National Honor Society), FCCLA (Future Career and Community Leaders of America), Student Council, Mat Maids, Schools for Schools, Media Club, Photo Society, Yearbook, Key Club, French Club, Norwegian Club, German Club, Culture Club, Breakfast Club, Interact, HOSA (Health Occupations Students of America), Skills USA, Speech & Debate, FCA (Fellowship of Christian Athletes), and JCA (Japanese Culture Club) are offered on Centennial's campus.

References

External links
 
 Centennial High School Alumni website

Public high schools in Arizona
Education in Peoria, Arizona
Educational institutions established in 1990
Schools in Maricopa County, Arizona
1990 establishments in Arizona